A Royal Romance or [Royal Romance] is a lost 1917 silent film comedy drama directed by James Vincent and starring Virginia Pearson and Irving Cummings. It was produced and distributed by the Fox Film Company.

Cast
Virginia Pearson - The Princess Sylvia
Royce Coombs - Her Brother
Irving Cummings - Emperor Maximilian
Charles Craig - Lord Fitzroy
Nora Cecil - Miss McPherson
Grace Henderson - Duchess Marcia
Nettie Slattery - Baroness Maxine
Alex Shannon - Prime Minister (*Alex K. Shannon)
Emil De Varney - Marco Romero

See also
1937 Fox vault fire

References

External links
 A Royal Romance at IMDb.com

1917 films
American silent feature films
Lost American films
American black-and-white films
Films directed by James Vincent
Fox Film films
1917 comedy-drama films
1917 lost films
Lost comedy-drama films
1910s American films
Silent American comedy-drama films